Senio Toleafoa (born 26 August 1993) is an Australian rugby union player who plays for the Waratahs in the Super Rugby competition. His position of choice is lock. He has also represented Samoa and Australia in their national under-20s teams.

On 23 August 2019, he was named in Samoa's 34-man training squad for the 2019 Rugby World Cup, before being named in the final 31 on 31 August.

References

Australian rugby union players
Australian sportspeople of Samoan descent
1993 births
Living people
Samoa international rugby union players
Samoan rugby union players
Sydney Stars players
Greater Sydney Rams players
New South Wales Waratahs players
USON Nevers players
North Harbour rugby union players
Rugby union locks
Rugby union players from Sydney